Aquisalimonas is a Gram-negative, non-endosore-forming, moderately halophilic, alkalitolerant and motile genus of bacteria from the family of Ectothiorhodospiraceae.

References

Chromatiales
Bacteria genera
Taxa described in 2007